The Queensland Rugby League South East Division (also known as the South East Division) is a rugby league division responsible for the running of rugby league in South-East Queensland. This makes the South East Division responsible for the FOGS Cup, FOGS Colts Challenge and Brisbane Second Division competitions. This Division also administers the City team in the annual QRL City-Country match. It is also responsible for administering the game of rugby league across the Gold Coast and Ipswich. These two cities alone comprise over 7000 junior and senior players.

In 2007 the East Division merged with the Southern Division to form the South East Queensland Division, decreasing the number of QRL divisions from 6 to 5.

Federations

Brisbane First Division

Brisbane Second Division

Senior 
In 2019 the open age Brisbane Second Division has teams in the following divisions:

Junior 
The QRL South East Division Juniors, soon to be known as the Greater Brisbane Junior Rugby League, or "The South East Stingers" is the arm of the Queensland Rugby League which administers and develops junior rugby league in the greater Brisbane area.

Its boundaries stretch from Burpengary in the North, to Beenleigh in the South and the Ipswich City/Brisbane boundary in the West. There's even a junior club on North Stradbroke Island.

Within this region are 45 affiliated junior rugby league clubs which had a combined Season 2006 total of 11,455 registered junior players within the Under 7 to Under 18 age groups. This equated to 676 teams in the overall competition for which an average of 320 fixture matches were played each weekend during the season across Brisbane. Each weekend an estimated 30,000 spectators attended those matches.

Gold Coast 
The Gold Coast Rugby League Premiership currently has 18 clubs, for senior and junior. All clubs are in the junior division but not all for the senior division.

Ipswich

Senior 

Previous clubs in the league include the Eastern Cobras.

Juniors 
 Brisbane Valley
 Ipswich Brothers
 Eastern Suburbs
 Fassifern Bombers
 Goodna Eagles
 Karalee Twin Rivers 
 Laidley Lions
 Lowood Tarampa Stags
 Moreton Twin Rivers
 Northern Suburbs Junior Minor RLFC 
 Redbank Plains
 Rosewood
 Springfield Panthers
 Ipswich Swifts
 West End

Masters Rugby League

Queensland Masters 
 Aspley Leagues Club
 Beenleigh Juniors RLFC
 Browns Plains RLFC
 Capalaba RLFC
 Deception Bay RLFC
 Easts Carina RLFC
 Easts Mt Gravatt Junior RLFC
 Goodna & Districts RLFC
 Logan Brothers RLFC
 Mustangs Brothers RLFC
 Rochedale Tigers RLFC
 Slacks Creek RLFC
 Sunnybank RLFC
 Wests RLFC
 Wynnum RLFC
 Redlands RLFC
 Waterford RLFC
 Banyo RLFC
 Inala RLFC
 Arana Hills  RLFC
 Goodna RLFC
 Souths RLFC

Former competitions

Brisbane 

Former top-flight rugby league competition from 1922 to 1994, second tier 1995 to 1997.

Sources
 Pramberg, Bernie " Mick in a league of his own" The Courier-Mail, 18 February 2006. Retrieved 18 February 2006.

See also

References

External links
Division website
Brisbane Second Division site
Greater Brisbane Junior Rugby League website
Gold Coast Rugby League website
Gold Coast Junior Rugby League website
Ipswich Rugby League website
Ipswich Junior Rugby League website
 Queensland Masters Rugby League Association inc

Queensland Rugby League
2007 establishments in Australia
Rugby league on the Gold Coast, Queensland